60 kDa SS-A/Ro ribonucleoprotein is a protein that in humans is encoded by the TROVE2 gene.

References

Further reading